Warren Steven Madrigal Molina (born 24 July 2004) is a Costa Rican professional footballer who currently plays as a forward for Saprissa.

Career statistics

Club

Notes

Honours

Club
Saprissa
Liga FPD: Clausura 2021

References

2004 births
Living people
Costa Rican footballers
Association football forwards
Deportivo Saprissa players
Liga FPD players